Holy Trinity Lutheran Church is a historic Lutheran church located at 31 South Duke Street in Lancaster, Pennsylvania. It is one of the oldest in the state.  The remains of both Thomas Mifflin and Thomas Wharton are interred at Holy Trinity Lutheran Church.

A Commonwealth of Pennsylvania historical marker at Trinity Church commemorates Thomas Wharton and Pennsylvania Governor Thomas Mifflin, the first and last Governors and Presidents of Pennsylvania under the 1776 State Constitution. The marker was dedicated in 1975 and is located on Duke Street in Lancaster. The text of the marker reads:

History
The church congregation was formed in 1730. The current building was completed in 1766.

References

External links
 
Official website

Churches in Lancaster County, Pennsylvania
Lutheran churches in Pennsylvania
Churches completed in 1766
18th-century Lutheran churches in the United States